C. V. Balakrishnan (born 24 September 1952) is an Indian writer of Malayalam literature. His novels and short stories encompass the emotional issues related to mass culture, sexual politics, fate of the marginalised and institutionalised religions. An author of more than 60 literary works along with a few film scripts and film criticisms, his best known work is the novel Ayussinte Pusthakam (The Book of Passing Shadows). He received the Kerala Sahitya Akademi Award thrice and the Kerala State Film Award for Best Book on Cinema in 2002 for Cinemayude Idangal. In 2014, he won the Padmaprabha Literary Award.

Biography
Balakrishnan was born in Payyannur, Kannur district, Kerala. After completing his school education, he took training in teaching and worked in various schools before shifting to Calcutta in 1979 where he worked as a freelance journalist. It was in Calcutta he began writing Ayussinte Pusthakam.

Ayussinte Pusthakam (The Book of Passing Shadows)

Ayussinte Pusthakam is considered one of the major works in the post-modernist Malayalam literature. Balakrishnan began writing this novel when he moved to Calcutta in late-1970s. An old edition of the Bible at St. Paul's Cathedral in Calcutta triggered the book in him. It took him three years to complete the novel. Says the author: "All the characters and villages of Christian settlers were in my mind long before I began thinking about writing Ayussinte Pusthakam. The characters are based on people I met during my course as a school teacher in a village in Kasaragod. I wrote Ayussinte Pusthakam at a time when I was going through an emotionally difficult period; my relation with my father was strained and I was feeling very lonely. Ayussinte Pusthakam is about loneliness." The book is also about sin and sadness, written in a style and language that have been judiciously borrowed from The Bible."
The novel was successfully adapted for the stage by suveeran in 2008. It won many Kerala Sangeetha Nataka Akademi Awards including one for the best play.

Bibliography

Novels

 Ayussinte Pusthakam (Kottayam: DC Books, 1984)
 Aathmavinu Sariyennu Thonnunna Karyangal (Kottayam: DC Books, 1997)
 Avanavante Anandam Kandethanulla Vazhikal (Kottayam: DC Books, 2006)
 Disa (Kottayam: DC Books, 2001)
 Ennum Njayarazhcha Aayirunnenkil (Calicut: Mathrubhumi, 2018)
 Jeevithame Nee Enthu? (Kottayam: DC Books, 1987)
 Kannadikkadal (Kottayam: DC Books, 1990)
 Kamamohitham (Valapad: August Books, 1994)
 Kalamezhuthu (Kottayam: N.B.S., 1981)
 Librarian (Kottayam: DC Books, 2014)
 Uparodham (Trivandrum: Chintha, 1981)
 Varu Daivame Varu (Calicut: Mathrubhumi, 2016)

Novellas

 Aadhi
 Aavanakkinte Oru Poovu Allenkil Erikkinter Oru Poovu
 Aagola Grameenar
 Ozhiyabadhakal (Calicut: Poorna, 1996)
 Drushti
 Asthikalile Venal
 Eenthappanayude Thottam
 Ellinpadangal Poovidumbol (Trivandrum: Prabhath, 1999)
 Globinte Ee Vasath
 Irattakkuttikalude Achan
 Parimalaparvatham (Kottayam: DC Books, 2003)
 Vilakkumadam
 Manassinu Ethra Thiraseelakal
 Manjuprathima
 Meen Pidikkaan Poya Gabriel
 Narthanasala
 Amen Amen
 Prappitiyan
 Sari, Pisachineppatti Samsarikkam
 Tharangaleela
 Vishadakala
 Viva Goa (Kottayam: DC Books, 2012)
 Vellivelichathil
 Ithivritham (Trichur: Current, 1994)
 Kadal Guhakal
 Oru Gothra Katha, Oru Charitra Katha, Oru Chalachitra Katha
 Maranam Ennu Perullavan
 Ottakkoru Penkutty (Trichur: Current, 1989)
 Jwalakalapam (Kottayam: DC Books, 1996)
 Etho Rajavinte Prajakal (Trichur: Current, 1985) (collection of five novelettes)
 Ente Pizha Ente Pizha Ente Valiya Pizha (Kottayam: DC Books, 1985) (collection of novelettes: Mazha Nanayunna Pavam, Daivame Ente Pizha Ente Pizha)
 Bhavabhayam (Kottayam: DC Books, 1997)
 Rathisandratha

Short story collections

 Bhumiye Patti Adhikam Parayanda (Kottayam: S.P.C.S., 1993)
 Daivam Piano Vaayikkumbol (Calicut: Mathrubhumi, 2020)
 Edwin Paul (Trichur: Current, 2016)
 Ente Bhranthan Kinavukal (Kottayam: DC Books, 2021)
 Ente Priyapetta Kathakal (Kottayam: DC Books, 2009) (20 selected stories)
 Katha (Calicut: Mulberry, 1999) (23 selected stories)
 Kulirum Mattu Kathakalum (Calicut: Poorna, 1999)
 Malakhamar Chiraku Veesumbol (Quilon: Imprint, 1994)
 Makkalum Mattu Kathakalum (Kottayam: S.P.C.S., 2000)
 Mamool (Trivandrum: Prabhath, 1999)
 Marukara (Calicut: Mulberry, 1987)
 Pranayakalam (Calicut: Mulberry, 1996)
 Sareeram Ariyunnathu
 Snehavirunnu (Trichur: Current, 1991)
 Thiranjedutha Kathakal (Kottayam: DC Books, 2014) (51 selected stories)
 Ulkrushtaraaya Manushyarum Undu
 Urangan Vayya
 Vishudha Chumbanam (Calicut: Mathrubhumi, 2014)

Autobiography

 Paralmeen Neenthunna Paadam (Calicut: Mathrubhumi, 2012)

Memoirs

 Saannidhyam 
 Sugandha Sasyangalkidayiloode 
 Vaathil Thurannitta Nagarathil
 Aathmaavinodu Cherunnathu

Travelogues

 Ethetho Saranikalil
 Yathrapathangalil
 Scottish Dinarathrangal

Translations

 Parethan (Translation of D. H. Lawrence's novel The Escaped Cock)
 Anyadesha Kathakal (Selected stories)
 Vegetarian (Translation of Han Kang's novel The Vegetarian)
 Vruddhanum Vankatalum (Translation of Ernest Hemingway's novel The Old Man and the Sea)

Others

 Cinemayude Idangal (Essays on Film)
 Mechilsthalangal (Essays)
 Thathyakal Mithyakal (Essays)
 Nerkazhchakalude Neru (Selected Journalism)
 Orma Mathram (Calicut: Mathrubhumi, 2012) (Screenplay)

Filmography

 Story, screenplay and dialogues

 Mattoral (1988)
 Puravrutham (1988)
 Sammanam (1997)
 Kattathoru Penpoovu (1997)
 Kochu Kochu Santhoshangal (2000)
 Orma Mathram (2011) 
 Vellivelichathil (2014)

 Story

 Irattakuttikalude Achan (1997)
 Kottaram Veettile Apputtan (1998)
 Thoramazhayathu (2010)
 Segment Puzha in the anthology Cheraathukal (2021)

Awards
 1994: SBI Malayalam Literary Award for Maalakhamaar chiraku veesumbol
 1998: V. T. Bhattathiripad Memorial Award for Atmavinu Sariyennu Thonnunna Karyangal
 2000: Kerala Sahitya Akademi Award (Novel) for Atmavinu Sariyennu Thonnunna Karyangal
 2001: Kerala Film Critics Association Award for Kochu Kochu Santhoshangal
 2002: Kerala State Film Award (Best Book on Cinema) for Cinemayude Idangal
 2008: Mayilpeeli Puraskaram
 2010: Shantakumaran Thampi Award
 2012: O. Chandu Menon Puraskaram
 2012: Basheer Puraskaram
 2012: Kalakeralam Award (Best screenplay) for Orma Mathram
 2013: Muttathu Varkey Award
 2014: Padmaprabha Literary Award
 2014: Kerala Sahitya Akademi Award (Biography and Autobiography) for Paralmeen Neenthunna Paadam
 2015: Abu Dhabi Malayalee Samajam Sahitya Puraskaram
 2017: Kerala Sahitya Akademi Award (Travelogue) for Ethetho Saranikalil
 2018: Mundur Krishnankutty Award

References

Further reading 
 C V Balakrishnan: Ezhuthinte Disakal (C V Balakrishnan: The directions of writings), edited by A. M. Sreedharan (DC Books, 2017)
 "കഥ എന്ന സഹയാത്രികന്‍: സിവി ബാലകൃഷ്ണന്‍ സംസാരിക്കുന്നു" (Interview). Samakalika Malayalam Vaarika. (in Malayalam).

External links
 
 

1952 births
Malayali people
Malayalam-language writers
Malayalam novelists
Malayalam short story writers
Malayalam screenwriters
Recipients of the Kerala Sahitya Akademi Award
Kerala State Film Award winners
Living people
Indian male short story writers
20th-century Indian short story writers
Writers from Kannur
Screenwriters from Kerala
20th-century Indian novelists
Indian male screenwriters
Indian male novelists
Novelists from Kerala
20th-century Indian male writers